A by-election was held for the New South Wales Legislative Assembly electorate of Bourke on 4 December 1891 because of the resignation of Peter Howe, which was given to the Speaker of the Legislative Assembly after he had been convicted of conspiracy to defraud.

Dates

Result

Peter Howe resigned.

See also
Electoral results for the district of Bourke
List of New South Wales state by-elections

References

1891 elections in Australia
New South Wales state by-elections
1890s in New South Wales